Chow Chun Fai (born 1980) is a Hong Kong contemporary artist specialized in visual art. He is a chairman of Fotanian Artist Village in Fo Tan, in Hong Kong  and one of the few artists who are actively engaged in politics. In 2012, he ran unsuccessfully for a cultural post in the Hong Kong legislative council election in the Sports, Performing Arts, Culture and Publication constituency.

Biography
Chow was born in Hong Kong in 1980. He graduated from the New Asia College of the Chinese University of Hong Kong (CUHK), where he earned a BA and an MFA from the Department of Fine Arts.
 In 2001, his father became ill, he took on the former's taxi licence and worked as a taxi driver until 2007 in addition to his studies. During this early period, his focus turned to portraying the Hong Kong landscapes he witnessed as a taxi driver, resulting in his series of paintings "Hong Kong Taxi" (2003–2005) and "Hong Kong Street" (2004–2005) rendered in either enamel as well as oil on canvas or board. 

Chow's artworks usually convey messages about politics or the current Hong Kong society. His artworks can mainly divided into several categories including "painting on movie", "Video on painting", "photo installation", "Hong Kong street", "Hong Kong Taxi", "Daily life" and "Portrait". His works have been exhibited in Hong Kong, Beijing, Shanghai, Singapore, Manchester, Munich, Salzburg, Vienna, Palermo, and Verona. Recent exhibitions include Liverpool Biennial, and Saatchi Gallery.

Awards

Solo exhibitions

Group Exhibition

References

External links
 

1980 births
Living people
Hong Kong artists
Hong Kong taxi drivers
Alumni of the Chinese University of Hong Kong